Criciúma Esporte Clube, commonly referred to as Criciúma, is a Brazilian professional club based in Criciúma, Santa Catarina founded on 13 May 1947.

Criciúma is the most successful team from Santa Catarina, having won the 1991 Copa do Brasil, the 2002 Campeonato Brasileiro Série B, and the 2006 Campeonato Brasileiro Série C.

History
Criciúma Esporte Clube was founded on May 13, 1947, as Comerciário Esporte Clube; however the club folded due to a financial crisis in the 1960s. The club refounded in 1976 by some of the original Comerciário Esporte Clube members. In 1978 the club was renamed as Criciúma Esporte Clube, and its current colors black, yellow and white were adopted in 1984. The present colors of Criciúma Esporte Clube are the reason the club is called Tigre (meaning Tiger).

The club's greatest feat was winning the 1991 Copa do Brasil under coach Felipe Scolari, later World Cup winner with Brazil, which qualified Criciúma to the following year's Copa Libertadores.

In the following years the club was not very successful, and was relegated to the Série B. In 2005, Criciúma, after a very poor campaign, was relegated to the Brazilian Série C. In 2006, Criciúma won the Série C, as was promoted back to the Série B.

After a period of crisis in the club, in 2012 the club regained forces and after being in the first four places the entire championship returned to the Série A.

Honors
Criciúma has won three national level championships. Winning the 1991 Copa do Brasil qualified the club to the 1992 Copa Libertadores where Criciúma finished in the 5th place, surpassing even the expectations of its fans. These achievements make Criciúma one of the most successful teams from Santa Catarina.

Copa do Brasil
 Winner (1): 1991

Série B
 Winner (1): 2002
 Runner-up (1): 2012

Série C
 Winner (1): 2006

Campeonato Catarinense
 Winners (10): 1968 (1), 1986, 1989, 1990, 1991, 1993, 1995, 1998, 2005, 2013
 Runners-up (7): 1982, 1987, 1994, 2001, 2002, 2007, 2008

Copa Santa Catarina
 Winner (1): 1993
 Runner-up (1): 1998

Campeonato Catarinense Série B
 Winner (1): 2022

1 Champion in 1968 as Comerciário Esporte Clube

Stadium

Criciúma's stadium is Estádio Heriberto Hülse, built in 1955, with a maximum capacity of 19,900 people.

Current squad

Head coaches

 Lori Sandri (1981), (1987), (1991)
 Edu (1987)
 Levir Culpi (1989–90)
 Luiz Felipe Scolari (1991)
 Levir Culpi (1992)
 Ivo Wortmann (1992)
 Lori Sandri (1994)
 Cláudio Duarte (1996)
 Pepe (1997)
 Cassiá (1999)
 Edson Gaúcho (2002)
 Cuca (2002–03)
 Lori Sandri (2003)
 Gilson Kleina (2003–04)
 Lori Sandri (2004)
 Vágner Benazzi (Feb 20, 2004 – Sept 2, 2004)
 José Luiz Plein (2005)
 Dorival Júnior (May 24, 2005 – July 7, 2005)
 Edson Gaúcho (July 28, 2005 – May 1, 2006)
 Paulinho Criciúma (2006)
 Gelson Silva (2006–07)
 Roberto Cavalo (Sept 12, 2007 – Nov 3, 2007)
 Gelson Silva (2008)
 Edson Gaúcho (July 10, 2008 – Sept 1, 2008)
 Paulo Campos (Sept 2, 2008 – Oct 15, 2008)
 Roberto Fonseca (April 29, 2009 – June 22, 2009)
 Itamar Schülle (2009–10)
 Argel Fucks (April 10, 2010 – Nov 12, 2010)
 Guilherme Macuglia (Nov 30, 2010 – April 24, 2011)
 Edson Gaúcho (April 28, 2011 – June 13, 2011)
 Guto Ferreira (June 14, 2011 – Aug 3, 2011)
 Mauro Fernandes (Aug 4, 2011 – Sept 19, 2011)
 Márcio Goiano (Sept 20, 2011 – Feb 14, 2012)
 Paulo Comelli (April 20, 2012 – March 3, 2013)
 Vadão (March 8, 2013 – Aug 23, 2013)
 Sílvio Criciúma (int.) (Aug 24, 2013 – Sept 23, 2013)
 Argel Fucks (Sept 24, 2013 – Dec 10, 2013)
 Ricardo Drubscky (Jan 1, 2014 – Feb 20, 2014)
 Caio Júnior (Feb 26, 2014 – April 29, 2014)
 Wagner Lopes (April 30, 2014 – Aug 25, 2014)
 Gilmar Dal Pozzo (2014)
 Toninho Cecílio (2014)
 Luizinho Vieira (2014–15)
 Moacir Júnior (2015)
 Dejan Petković (2015)
 Roberto Cavalo (2015–2016)
 Deivid (2017)
 Luiz Carlos Winck (2017)
 Beto Campos (2017–present)

1991 Copa do Brasil
Criciúma won the Copa do Brasil 1991, playing the following matches:

Competitions record

Notes

External links
 Official Site
 Discussion List

 
Association football clubs established in 1947
Football clubs in Santa Catarina (state)
1947 establishments in Brazil
Copa do Brasil winning clubs